The Atoyac chub (Notropis cumingii) is a species of ray-finned fish in the genus Notropis. It is endemic to Mexico.

References 

Notropis
Freshwater fish of Mexico
Endemic fish of Mexico
Fish described in 1868
Taxa named by Albert Günther